Almon A. Swan ( 1819 – May 17, 1883) was a member of the Wisconsin State Assembly.

Biography
Swan was born in Berlin, New York, sources have differed on the exact date. He married Esther D. Alderman in Massachusetts in 1841. He died on May 17, 1883.

Career
Swan was a member of the Assembly during the 1878 session. Other positions he held include Chairman (similar to Mayor) of Oakfield (town), Wisconsin. He was a Republican.

References

External links
Ancestry.com

People from Rensselaer County, New York
People from Oakfield, Wisconsin
Republican Party members of the Wisconsin State Assembly
Mayors of places in Wisconsin
1883 deaths
Burials in Wisconsin
Year of birth uncertain